Kanaris may refer to:

People
 Kanaris family members:
 Aristeidis Kanaris (1831–1863), Greek Army officer, son of Konstantinos Kanaris
 Konstantinos Kanaris (1790–1877), Greek admiral and statesman
 Miltiadis Kanaris (1822–1901), Greek admiral and politician, son of Konstantinos Kanaris

Other uses
 Greek ship Kanaris, several ships named after Konstantinos Kanaris

See also
 Canaris (disambiguation)